Panay is the sixth-largest and fourth-most populous island in the Philippines, with a total land area of  and has a total population of 4,542,926 as of 2020 census. Panay comprises 4.4 percent of the entire population of the country. The City of Iloilo is its largest settlement with a total population of 457,626 inhabitants as of 2020 census.

Panay is a triangular island, located in the western part of the Visayas. It is divided into four provinces: Aklan, Antique, Capiz, and Iloilo, all in the Western Visayas Region. Just closely off the mid-southeastern coast lies the island-province of Guimaras. It is located southeast of the island of Mindoro and northwest of Negros across the Guimaras Strait. To the north and northeast is the Sibuyan Sea, Jintotolo Channel and the island-provinces of Romblon and Masbate; to the west and southwest is the Sulu Sea and the Palawan archipelago and to the south is Panay Gulf. Panay is the only main island in the Visayas whose provinces don't bear the name of their island.

Panay is bisected by the Central Panay Mountain Range, its longest mountain chain.

Historically, the terms Bisaya or Visayan were first used to refer only to the people of this island, the Panayan or Hiligaynon people, and to their other settlements on the nearby islands, in the western portion of Negros Island and the smaller islands of Romblon and Guimaras. Panay also originally representing the entire Visayas region on the Philippine flag as one of the three stars, as it served as the center or mainland of the Visayas during the Philippine Revolution.

The island lent its name to several United States Navy vessels including , sunk in 1937 by the Japanese in the USS Panay incident.

History

Etymology
Before 1212, Panay was called Simsiman. The community is located at the shores of the Ulian River and was linked by a creek. The creek provided salt to the Ati people as well as animals which lick the salt out of the salty water. Coming from the root word "simsim", "simsimin" means "to lick something to eat or to drink", thus the place was called Simsiman.

The native Ati called the island Aninipay from words "ani" to harvest and "nipay", a hairy grass abundant in the whole Panay.

Before the arrival of the Europeans

No pre-Hispanic written accounts of Iloilo and Panay island exist today. Oral traditions, in the form of recited epics like the Hinilawod, have survived to a small degree. A few recordings of these epic poems exist. The most notable are the works of noted Filipino anthropologist Felipe Jocano.

While no current archaeological evidence exists describing pre-Hispanic Panay, an original work by Pedro Alcantara Monteclaro published in 1907 called Maragtas details the alleged accounts of the founding of the various pre-Hispanic polities on Panay Island. The book is based on oral and written accounts available to the author at the time. The author made no claim for the historical accuracy of the accounts. Noted anthropologist and historian William Henry Scott initially concluded in his dissertation that it was a myth, but in a revised version admitted its credibility is debatable and concluded it was most likely based on real folk legends.

According to Maragtas, the Kedatuan of Madja-as was founded after ten datus fled Borneo and landed on Panay Island. The book then goes on to detail their subsequent purchase of the coastal lands in which they settled from the native Ati people.

An old manuscript Margitas of uncertain date (discovered by the anthropologist H. Otley Beyer) gives interesting details about the laws, government, social customs, and religious beliefs of the early Visayans, who settled Panay within the first half of the thirteenth century. The term Visayan was first applied only to them and to their settlements eastward in the island of Negros, and northward in the smaller islands, which now compose the province of Romblon. In fact, even at the early part of Spanish colonialization of the Philippines, the Spaniards used the term Visayan only for these areas. While the people of Cebu, Bohol, and Leyte were for a long time known only as Pintados. The name Visayan was later extended to them because, as several of the early writers state, their languages are closely allied to the Visayan dialect of Panay.

Gabriel Ribera, captain of the Spanish royal infantry in the Philippine Islands, also distinguished Panay from the rest of the Pintados Islands. In his report (dated 20 March 1579) regarding a campaign to pacify the natives living along the rivers of Mindanao (a mission he received from Dr. Francisco de Sande, Governor and Captain-General of the Archipelago), Ribera mentioned that his aim was to make the inhabitants of that island "vassals of King Don Felipe… as are all the natives of the island of Panay, the Pintados Islands, and those of the island of Luzon…"

During the early part of the colonial period in the Archipelago, the Spaniards led by Miguel López de Legazpi transferred their camp from Cebu to Panay in 1569. On 5 June 1569, Guido de Lavezaris, the royal treasurer in the Archipelago, wrote to Philip II reporting about the Portuguese attack to Cebu in the preceding autumn. A letter from another official, Andres de Mirandaola (dated three days later, 8 June), also described briefly this encounter with the Portuguese. The danger of another attack led the Spaniards to remove their camp from Cebu to Panay, which they considered a safer place. Legazpi himself, in his report to the Viceroy in New Spain (dated 1 July 1569), mentioned the same reason for the relocation of Spaniards to Panay. It was in Panay that the conquest of Luzon was planned, and later launched on 8 May 1570.

The account of early Spanish explorers

During the early part of the Spanish colonization of the Philippines, the Spanish Augustinian Friar Gaspar de San Agustín, O.S.A. described Panay as: "…very similar to that of Sicily in its triangular form, as well as in it fertility and abundance of provision. It is the most populated island after Manila and Mindanao, and one of the largest (with over a hundred leagues of coastline). In terms of fertility and abundance, it is the first. […] It is very beautiful, very pleasant, and full of coconut palms… Near the river Alaguer (Halaur), which empties into the sea two leagues from the town of Dumangas…, in the ancient times, there was a trading center and a court of the most illustrious nobility in the whole island." Padre Francisco Colin (1592–1660), an early Jesuit missionary and Provincial of his Order in the Philippines also records in the chronicles of the Society of Jesus (published later in 1663 as Labor euangelica) that Panay is the island which is most abundant and fertile.

The first Spanish settlement in Panay island and the second oldest Spanish settlement in the Philippines was established by the Miguel López de Legazpi expedition in Panay, Capiz at the banks of the Panay River in northern Panay, the name of which was extended to the whole Panay island. López de Legazpi transferred the capital there from Cebu since it had abundant provisions and was better protected from Portuguese attacks before the capital was once again transferred to Manila.

Miguel de Luarca, who was among the first Spanish settlers in the Island, made one of the earliest account about Panay and its people according to a Westerner's point of view. In June 1582, while he was in Arévalo (Iloilo), he wrote in his Relación de las Yslas Filipinas the following observations:

The island is the most fertile and well-provisioned of all the islands discovered, except the island of Luzon: for it is exceedingly fertile, and abounds in rice, swine, fowls, wax, and honey; it produces also a great quantity of cotton and abacá fiber.

"The villages are very close together, and the people are peaceful and open to conversion. The land is healthful and well-provisioned, so that the Spaniards who are stricken in other islands go thither to recover their health."

"The natives are healthy and clean, and although the island of Cebu is also healthful and had a good climate, most of its inhabitants are always afflicted with the itch and buboes. In the island of Panay, the natives declare that no one of them had ever been afflicted with buboes until the people from Bohol – who, as we said above, abandoned Bohol on account of the people of Maluco – came to settle in Panay, and gave the disease to some of the natives. For these reasons the governor, Don Gonzalo Ronquillo, founded the town of Arévalo, on the south side of this island; for the island runs north and south, and on that side live the majority of the people, and the villages are near this town, and the land here is more fertile." This probably explains why there are reference of presence of Pintados in the Island.

"The island of Panay provides the city of Manila and other places with a large quantity of rice and meat…"... "As the island contains great abundance of timber and provisions, it has almost continuously had a shipyard on it, as is the case of the town of Arévalo, for galleys and fragatas. Here the ship 'Visaya' was launched."

Another Spanish chronicler in the early Spanish period,  Dr. Antonio de Morga (Year 1609) is also responsible for recording other Visayan customs. Customs such as Visayans' affinity for singing among their warrior-castes as well as the playing of gongs and bells in naval battles.

Their customary method of trading was by bartering one thing for another, such as food, cloth, cattle, fowls, lands, houses, fields, slaves, fishing-grounds, and palm-trees (both nipa and wild). Sometimes a price intervened, which was paid in gold, as agreed upon, or in metal bells brought from China. These bells they regard as precious jewels; they resemble large pans and are very sonorous. They play upon these at their feasts, and carry them to the war in their boats instead of drums and other instruments.

The early Dutch fleet commander Cornelis Matelieff de Jonge called at Panay in 1607. He mentions a town named "Oton" on the island where there were "18 Spanish soldiers with a number of other Spanish inhabitants so that there may be 40 whites in all". He explained that "a lot of rice and meat is produced there, with which they [i.e. the Spanish] supply Manila."

According to Stephanie J. Mawson, using recruitment records found in Mexico, in addition to the 40 Caucasian Spaniards who then lived in Oton, there were an additional set of 66 Mexican soldiers of Mulatto, Mestizo or Native American descent sentried there during the year 1603. However, the Dutch visitor, Cornelis Matelieff de Jongedid, did not count them in since they were not pure whites like him.

Iloilo City in Panay was awarded by the Queen of Spain the title: "La Muy Leal y Noble Ciudad de Iloilo" (The Most Loyal and Noble City) for being the most loyal and noble city in the Spanish Empire since it clung on to Spain amidst the Philippine revolution the last nation to revolt against Spain in the Spanish Empire.

Colonial rule (1565-1898) 
In 1572, the island was organized into two provinces: jurisdictions of Panay (Capiz and Aklan) and Oton (Iloilo and Antique).

In 1693, the town of Capiz, known as El Puerto de Capiz was finally created.

In 1716, Capiz was organized into a separate politico-military province with the transfer of the capital from the town of Panay, Under its jurisdiction were the neighboring islands of Campo, Romblon, Tablas, and Sibuyan.

In 1796, Panay island was divided into three provinces: Iloilo, Antique, and Capiz (which included Aklan and Romblon).

In 1853, The island now comprising Romblon province and Maestre de Campo was organized into separate politico-military “comandancia” administered from Capiz.

In 1898, The Spanish educated Panay Island and were replaced by the revolutionary forces, who were in turn overthrown by the American the following year.

Aklan (Akean) became an independent province through Republic Act No. 1414 signed by Philippine President Ramon Magsaysay on April 25, 1956, separating Aklan from Capiz. The original towns were Altavas, Balete, Batan, Banga, Buruanga, Ibajay, Kalibo, Lezo, Libacao, Madalag, Malay, Makato, Malinao, Nabas, New Washington, Numancia, and Tangalan, then all part of the province of Capiz. The province was inaugurated on November 8, 1956. Jose Raz Menez was appointed the first governor of Aklan by President Magsaysay and he served until December 30, 1959. In 1960, Godofredo P. Ramos became the first elected governor but upon resigning to run for Congress he was succeeded by the vice governor, Virgilio S. Patricio. In 1964, José B. Legaspi succeeded Patricio and he held office for two consecutive terms from 1964 to 1971.

World War II 

Panay was a target by the Japanese in order to secure the rest of Visayas and so on April 16, 1942, Imperial Japanese Army forces landed on San Jose de Buenavista, Capiz City (now the city of Roxas) and Iloilo City.

However, guerrilla forces under Col. Macario Peralta Jr. would later on liberate most of the island and eventually capturing the city of Capiz on December 20, 1944 and therefore the liberation of the entire Capiz Province before the Allied forces land on Iloilo City on March 18, 1945 where they mopped up the remaining Japanese forces in the island.

Geography

Panay River is the longest river in the island with a total length of  located in the province of Capiz.

It is part of Aklan province under the jurisdiction of the municipality of Malay.

Topography 
List of peaks in Panay Island by elevation:
Mount Madja-as 
Mount Nangtud 
Mount Igmatindog

River systems 
List of rivers in Panay Island by length:
Panay River - 
Jalaur River - 
Aklan River - 
Sibalom River - 
Iloilo River - 
Mao-it River -  *
Bugang River -

Administrative divisions
The island is covered by 4 provinces, 1 highly urbanized city, 2 component cities, 92 municipalities (93 municipalities if the associated islands of Caluya are included), and 3,291 barangays, all under the jurisdiction of the Western Visayas region.

Transportation

Road 
All the provinces in Panay are interconnected by major inter-provincial roads. Iloilo City is served mostly by passenger jeepneys, white metered taxis and tricycles within the city limits. The primary transportation vehicle used within Roxas City, Kalibo, San Jose de Buenavista and other cities and municipalities in Panay is the tricycle. Travel between cities and municipalities is typically by jeepney, vans and Ceres operated buses. In March 2019, the Land Transportation Franchising and Regulatory Board announced the opening of a new Premium Point-to-Point Bus Service in Iloilo City with express bus services to the airports in Cabatuan, Kalibo and Boracay (Caticlan).

Iloilo is one of the few cities in the Philippines that recently initiated to adopt the mini-bus-like type modern PUJ or modern Jeepneys in contrast to the President Rodrigo Duterte's administration to phase out the old dilapidated jeepneys as the mode of mass public transportation in the Philippines.

The Iloilo-Capiz-Aklan Expressway is also being proposed, which might reduce travel time between provinces in Panay. It will connect Iloilo City and Malay, Aklan through Passi City, Roxas City and Kalibo, Aklan.

Airports 

Panay Island is now served by seven airports (five on the mainland). The Iloilo International Airport, located in Cabatuan, Iloilo, serves the general area of Iloilo-Guimaras Metropolitan as well the whole province of Iloilo, and is also considered to be the primary gateway into the region. The Kalibo International Airport is one of the two airports serving Boracay, the other being Godofredo P. Ramos Airport (also known as Caticlan Airport) in the municipality of Malay. The Roxas Airport is a domestic airport serving the general area of Roxas City and the province of Capiz. The Evelio Javier Airport (Antique Airport) is the only airport serving the province of Antique located in San Jose. The other, Semirara Airport in Caluya is a municipal airport.

International 

 Iloilo International Airport
 Kalibo International Airport

Domestic 

 Godofredo P. Ramos Airport (Caticlan Airport)
 Roxas Airport
 Evelio Javier Airport (Antique Airport)
 Sicogon Island Airport (in Sicogon Island, Carles, Iloilo)
 Semirara Airport (in Semirara Island, Caluya, Antique)

Rail 
Proposals to re-connect again Iloilo-Roxas, Iloilo-Kalibo, Iloilo-Malay (Aklan) and Iloilo-San Jose (Antique) from the Iloilo City via rail was included in the revival of the currently defunct Panay Railways network which has a station in Santa Barbara town proper.

Demographics
Panay is the most ethnically and linguistically diverse major island in the Visayas, being native to four non-indigenous ethnolinguistic groups (Hiligaynon/Ilonggo, Karay-a, Capiznon, Aklanon), and two indigenous groups (Suludnon, Ati) or minorities. However, the ethnic and linguistic boundaries within the island do not correspond to its administrative divisions. Only the province of Antique is monolingual, which only speaks Kinaray-a as its primary language. The lingua franca of the island is Hiligaynon, native to Iloilo City and the northeastern coastal strip lining the province of Iloilo. For local administrative, educational, and commercial purposes, English and Tagalog are also widely used.

See also
 Macario Peralta, Jr.
 Panay Railways
 Church of Panay

References

External links

 
 

 
Landforms of the Sulu Sea
Islands of Aklan
Islands of Antique (province)
Islands of Capiz
Islands of Iloilo